Montrose Cemetery is located at 5400 North Pulaski Road, in Chicago, Illinois.

Montrose Cemetery was founded by Andrew Kircher in 1902. Five years after the Iroquois Theatre fire, Kircher erected a memorial at Montrose Cemetery to memorialize the tragedy.

Notable burials
 Kathleen Burke (1913–1980), actress
 Iva Toguri D'Aquino (1916–2006), known as Tokyo Rose)
 Bugs Raymond (1882–1912), MLB player
 Herbert Sobel (1912–1987), WWII US Army officer

References

External links
 
 
 

1902 establishments in Illinois
Cemeteries in Chicago